The Men's 50 metre butterfly competition of the swimming events at the 2015 World Aquatics Championships was held on 2 August with the heats and the semifinals and 3 August with the final.

Records
Prior to the competition, the existing world and championship records were as follows.

Results

Heats
The heats were held at 10:44.

Semifinals
The semifinals were held on 2 August at 18:07.

Semifinal 1

Semifinal 2

Final

The final was held on 3 August at 18:17.

References

Men's 50 metre butterfly